Acanthoceras zachariasii is a species of diatom belonging to the family Chaetocerotaceae.

It has cosmopolitan distribution.

References

Diatoms